Danijel Ćulum (born August 19, 1989) is a Bosnian-Herzegovinian football player, who plays for NK Zvijezda Gradačac.

Club career
His previous clubs include HŠK Zrinjski Mostar, Kaposvári Rákóczi FC, NK GOŠK Gabela and FK Radnik Bijeljina.

References

External links
 Player profile at NSO 
 
 Danijel Ćulum at Footballdatabase

1989 births
Living people
People from Zvornik
Association football wingers
Bosnia and Herzegovina footballers
HŠK Zrinjski Mostar players
FK Drina Zvornik players
Kaposvári Rákóczi FC players
NK GOŠK Gabela players
FK Radnik Bijeljina players
NK Travnik players
FK Zvijezda 09 players
NK Zvijezda Gradačac players
Premier League of Bosnia and Herzegovina players
First League of the Republika Srpska players
Nemzeti Bajnokság I players
Bosnia and Herzegovina expatriate footballers
Expatriate footballers in Hungary
Bosnia and Herzegovina expatriate sportspeople in Hungary